Lauren Sanderson (born January 13, 1996) is an American singer and songwriter originally from Fort Wayne, Indiana currently based in Los Angeles. Her music blends influences from pop, R&B, and hip hop, and through it she aims to empower her fans and be "the voice for people who may not be able to speak."

Early life
Sanderson grew up an only child of divorced parents. By 2014, she had built an online presence as a YouTube personality, for which she was recognized as "Most Influential Up & Comer" at the Indiana Social Media Summit six months after graduating high school. At the time she was receiving over a million views a day on her social media. In 2015, she presented a TEDx Talk titled "For God’s Sake, Just Love Them" about coming out as gay and how parents can foster a relationship of mutual respect with their children. As she continued giving motivational speeches at local schools and amassing an online following, she began channeling the stress of maintaining her positive outlook into writing raps and poems. Originally influenced by artists like Mac Miller, Logic, and Tyler, the Creator, she would search for similar beats on YouTube and sing over them on cassettes played in her car stereo.

Career

2016–2017: Center of Expression and Spaces
Sanderson gained early attention as a musician via her YouTube and SoundCloud channels, including a cover of Maroon 5's "She Will Be Loved." In June 2016, Sanderson released her debut EP Center of Expression and was subsequently hailed an "artist to watch" by Young Hollywood

Like her first, in 2017 Sanderson released her second EP Spaces independently, which reached No. 1 on the iTunes R&B albums chart and No. 24 on Billboard Heatseekers chart. The success of the EP garnered the attention of Epic Records, with whom Sanderson signed a record deal and moved to Los Angeles. Sanderson promoted the release with an 18 city self-booked tour.

2018: Epic Records and Dont Panic!

Sanderson re-released her song "Written in the Stars" (previously included on her Spaces EP) produced by FKi 1st and Earl Saga in March 2018 with the addition of Philadelphia rapper PnB Rock, and used the single release to publicly announce her signing with Epic Records.

In August 2018, Sanderson released her debut major-label six-track EP Dont Panic! on Epic Records, which reached No. 2 on the iTunes R&B charts as well as No. 48 on the main chart. The title, which is also tattooed on her neck, was self-reassurance about overcoming the pressures of the music industry. To promote the release, Sanderson performed at LA Pride in West Hollywood, an LA Sparks halftime show for their Pride Night, and the BET Experience at the Los Angeles Convention Center.

In December, Sanderson was featured as part of Vevo's DSCVR Artist to Watch series and performed at their SXSW Vevo House showcase in March 2019.

2019–present: Hasta La Vista and Midwest Kids Can Make It Big
Sanderson would eventually leave Epic Records, self-releasing a 3-song EP Hasta La Vista in June 2019 which she used to announce her independence on Twitter, and later signed a one-album deal with executive Chris Anokute and his label Young Forever. That same month, Sanderson began supporting Chase Atlantic on their Phases Tour.	

On September 24, 2019, Sanderson released her first single "Hotel Room" from her forthcoming debut album, which premiered on Zane Lowe's Beats 1 show on Apple Music, followed by a music video on September 27. She joined Finneas on his Blood Harmony tour and released two additional singles, "Upset" and "To the People I Hurt," in late 2019 before ultimately releasing her album Midwest Kids Can Make It Big in January 2020. Sanderson had announced tour dates beginning in March to promote the release, though they were postponed due to the COVID-19 pandemic.

In August, Sanderson announced a deluxe version of her debut album and released her new single "Frustrated", whose music video premiered on Ones To Watch, and announced her rescheduled tour dates beginning in April 2021. The track received accolades from Alt Press who included it in their "40 Artists You Need to Hear in September" list, as well as Billboard who named it one of their "10 Cool New Pop Songs to Get You Through the Week". The deluxe version was released on August 21, featuring 7 previously unreleased tracks. Sanderson plans to return to being independent in 2021.

Discography

Albums

EPs

Singles

References

External links 
 Official website
 For God’s Sake, Just Love Them | Lauren Sanderson | TEDxFortWayne

Musicians from Fort Wayne, Indiana
Living people
1996 births
American LGBT singers
LGBT people from Indiana